The 1994 York City Council elections took place in May 1994 to elect the members of York City Council in North Yorkshire, England. These were the final elections to York City Council. Fifteen seats, previously contested in 1990, were up for election: twelve were won by the Labour Party, two by the Liberal Democrats and one by the Conservative Party.

Election results

Ward results

Acomb Ward

Beckfield Ward

Bishophill Ward

Bootham Ward

Clifton Ward

Fishergate Ward

Foxwood Ward

Guildhall Ward

Heworth Ward

Holgate Ward

Knavesmire Ward

Micklegate Ward

Monk Ward

Walmgate Ward

Westfield Ward

References

1994 English local elections
1994
1990s in York